The "Subversive Proposal" was an Internet posting by Stevan Harnad on June 27 1994 (presented at the 1994 Network Services Conference in London ) calling on all authors of "esoteric" research writings to archive their articles for free for everyone online (in anonymous FTP archives or websites). It initiated a series of online exchanges, many of which were collected and published as a book in 1995: "Scholarly Journals at the Crossroads: A Subversive Proposal for Electronic Publishing". This led to the creation in 1997 of Cogprints, an open access archive for self-archived articles in the cognitive sciences and in 1998 to the creation of the American Scientist Open Access Forum (initially called the "September98 Forum" until the founding of the Budapest Open Access Initiative which first coined the term "Open Access"). The Subversive Proposal also led to the development of the GNU EPrints software used for creating OAI-compliant open access institutional repositories, and inspired CiteSeer, a tool to locate and index the resulting eprints.

The proposal was updated gradually across the years, as summarized in the American Scientist Open Access Forum on its 10th anniversary.
A retrospective was written by Richard Poynder.
A self-critique
was posted on its 15th anniversary in 2009. An online interview of Stevan Harnad was conducted by Richard Poynder on the occasion of the 20th anniversary of the subversive proposal.

References

 Bosc, Hélène Les idées et la technique : une rétrospective de ces 15 dernières années

Further reading
 Harnad, Stevan (1995):
(2001/2003/2004) For Whom the Gate Tolls? Published as:
(2003) Open Access to Peer-Reviewed Research Through Author/Institution Self-Archiving: Maximizing Research Impact by Maximizing Online Access. In: Law, Derek & Judith Andrews, Eds. Digital Libraries: Policy Planning and Practice. Ashgate Publishing 2003.
(2003) Journal of Postgraduate Medicine 49: 337–342.
(2004) Historical Social Research (HSR) 29:1
(2003) Ciélographie et ciélolexie: Anomalie post-gutenbergienne et comment la résoudre in: Origgi, G. & Arikha, N. (eds) Le texte à l'heure de l'Internet. Bibliothèque Centre Pompidou: Pp. 77–103.
  Okerson, Ann Shumelda & O'Donnell, James J. (1995) (Eds.) Scholarly Journals at the Crossroads: A Subversive Proposal for Electronic Publishing. Washington, DC., Association of Research Libraries, June 1995.
 Suber, Peter Timeline of the Open Access Movement (February 2009; archived copy from 2016)

External links
 American Scientist Open Access Forum Official Site
 Global Open Access Forum Official Site

History of the Internet
Open access (publishing)
Communication
Academic publishing
Research
Online archives